The 2015 DBL Playoffs was the postseason tournament of the Dutch Basketball League's (DBL) 2014–15 season. The tournament concluded with Donar Groningen playing SPM Shoeters Den Bosch in the Finals.

Bracket

Because the number of teams in the DBL decreased to 9, a new Playoff format was chosen. After the seeds 3 till 6 played a best-of-three series in the quarter-finals, the semi-finals and finals would be played in a best-of-seven system.

References

Dutch Basketball League playoffs
Playoffs